Dal-dong is a dong, or neighborhood, of Nam-gu in Ulsan, South Korea.

See also
South Korea portal

References

External links
Ulsan Namgu home page

Nam District, Ulsan
Neighbourhoods in South Korea